Roman Christianity may refer to:
State church of the Roman Empire
Roman Christianity, the doctrine of the contemporary Roman Catholic Church
Roman Christianity, early Christianity in Rome during the 1st to 4th centuries

See also
Christianization of the Roman Empire
Constantine the Great and Christianity
Decline of Greco-Roman polytheism
Persecution of Christians in the Roman Empire
Religion in ancient Rome